Onderweg naar Morgen is a Dutch television soap opera based on Ryan's Hope. The series was aired by Veronica between 1994 and 2001, including co-broadcasting with TROS in 1994 and 1995. When Veronica announced that it would leave the join venture with Holland Media Groep, RTL was forced to rebrand the station as Yorin, which continued to broadcast the series between 2001 and 2005. In 2005 the series was sold to BNN, which continued to air it until 2010 when the series ended. Since 2012, the series has aired in syndication on NPO 1 Extra.

Cast

A

B

C

D

E

F

G

H

I

J

K

L

M

N

O

P

Q

R

S

T

U

V

W

X

Y

Z

Dutch television soap operas
1990s Dutch television series
2000s Dutch television series
2010s Dutch television series
1994 Dutch television series debuts
2010 Dutch television series endings